The 1980 Australian Sports Car Championship was a CAMS sanctioned Australian motor racing title open to Group D Production Sports Cars. The title, which was the twelfth Australian Sports Car Championship, was won by Allan Moffat, driving a Porsche 930 Turbo.

Calendar
The championship was contested over a five-round series with two heats per round.

Classes
Cars competed in two engine displacement classes:
 Up to and including 2000cc
 Over 2000cc

Points system
Round results were determined by allocating points on a 20-16-13-11-10-9-8-7-6-5-4-3-2-1 basis for the top fourteen places in each heat. Where drivers attained the same number of points, the placings achieved in the second heat were used to determine the round placing.

Actual championship points were then awarded on a 4-3-2-1 basis for the first four outright places at each round, regardless of class. Additionally, championship points were awarded on a 9-6-4-3-2-1 basis for the first six places in each class at each round.

Championship results
The top nine championship placings were as follows:

References

External links
 Image of the Allan Moffat Porsche 930 Turbo at the Amaroo Park round of the 1980 Australian Sports Car Championship, i187.photobucket.com, as archived at web.archive.org
 Baskerville Raceway Photo Catalogue, oldmotorsportphotos.com.au - includes links to Entry List and image gallery for the Baskerville round of the 1980 Australian Sports Car Championship

Australian Sports Car Championship
Sports Car Championship